Cylindrobasidium is a species of fungus in the family Physalacriaceae.

A product which contains Cylindrobasidium laeve as the active ingredient can be used as a mycoherbicide to control Acacia mearnsii (black wattle) in South Africa.

Taxonomy
Initially described by Persoon in 1794 as Corticium laeve, the modern Index Fungorum name was given in 1984 by George Peter Chamuris.

In Europe
It is very common in Poland, usually found on various types of forests, bushes, parks, gardens, roadsides, trunks and branches of deciduous trees. It was found on the following species and types of trees: maples, chestnut tree, alder, silver birch, hornbeam, hazel, hawthorn, beech, hairy ash, apple, black poplar, plum tree, Robinia pseudoacacia, willow, and lime. It occurs rarely on conifers.

Gallery

References

Offsite
  BioNET-EAFRINET: Acacia mearnsii (Black Wattle)
 Mycobank: Cylindrobasidium laeve
 Scottish fungi: Cylindrobasidium laeve

Physalacriaceae